The 1991 Girabola was the 13th season of top-tier football competition in Angola. Atlético Petróleos de Luanda were the defending champions.

The league comprised 16 teams, the bottom two of which were relegated.

Primeiro de Agosto were crowned champions, winning their 4th title, while Desportivo da Cuca and Desportivo de Saurimo were relegated.

Amaral Aleixo of Sagrada Esperança finished as the top scorer with 23 goals.

Changes from the 1990 season
Relegated: None
Promoted: Benfica de Cabinda, Nacional Benguela

League table

Results

Season statistics

Top scorer
 Amaral Aleixo

Champions

External links
Federação Angolana de Futebol

Girabola seasons
Angola
Angola